Scream is an American anthology slasher television series developed by Jill Blotevogel, Dan Dworkin and Jay Beattie for MTV and Brett Matthews for VH1. It is based on the slasher film series of the same name created by Kevin Williamson and Wes Craven. The series premiered on June 30, 2015.

Series overview

Episodes

Season 1 (2015)

Season 2 (2016)

Season 3: Resurrection (2019)

Scream After Dark
Scream After Dark is a half-hour television aftershow hosted by Jeffery Self, which features behind the scenes footage, comedy sketches and interviews with the main cast from the series in which they discuss an episode of Scream following its original airing. The aftershow featured three installments which aired following the first, eighth and twelfth episodes of the second season.

Ratings

Season 1

Season 2

Season 3

References

Lists of American teen drama television series episodes
Lists of horror television series episodes
Scream (franchise) lists
Episodes